FK Olympic is an Uzbek professional football club based in Tashkent that currently plays in the Uzbekistan Super League.

History

Domestic history

Players

Current squad

Honours

Domestic
Uzbekistan Pro League
 third pease 2021

References

External links
teams.by
Soccerway profile

2021 establishments in Uzbekistan
Football clubs in Uzbekistan
Tashkent Region